The Goose Creek Mountains are a mountain range in Box Elder County, Utah.  They are also partly in Elko County, Nevada. It is the least topographically prominent of Utah's peaks with more than 609.6 ft (2000 ft) of prominence.

References 

Mountain ranges of Utah
Mountain ranges of Box Elder County, Utah
Mountain ranges of Nevada
Mountain ranges of Elko County, Nevada